The General Jan Smuts Regiment (formerly ) is a reserve mechanised infantry regiment of the South African Army.

History

Origin
Regiment Westelike Provinsie (RWP) was one of eight Afrikaner-oriented Traditional Citizen Force infantry units raised by the Union Defence Force on 1 April 1934, as part of a programme to rebuild the UDF after the Great Depression.

Predecessors 
While RWP was only raised in 1934, it regards itself as the successor to several small and short-lived units which were formed in the Western Cape country districts in the nineteenth century and early twentieth century. They were:

First Volunteer Movement 
 Stellenbosch Volunteersformed 1856, disbanded 
 Worcester volunteersformed 1856, disbanded 
 Paarl Rifle Corpsformed 1856, disbanded 1859
 Malmesbury Volunteer Cavalryformed 1856, disbanded 
 Paarl Cavalryformed 1857, disbanded 1859
 Paarl United Volunteersformed 1859, disbanded 
 Robertson and Montague Rifle Corpsformed 1860, disbanded 

No volunteer units in these districts between 1866 and 1878.

Second Volunteer Movement 
 Worcester Volunteer Riflesformed 1878, disbanded 
 Worcester Volunteer Riflesformed 1885, disbanded 1901
 Paarl Volunteer Riflesformed 1885, disbanded 1897
 Wellington Volunteer Riflesformed 1885, disbanded 1901
 Victoria College Volunteer Riflesformed 1888, disbanded 1899
 Robertson Volunteer Riflesformed 1890, disbanded
 Malmesbury Volunteer Riflesformed 1892, disbanded 1896.
 Western Riflesan administrative grouping, which existed from 1893 to 1908, of the Worcester, Paarl, Wellington, Stellenbosch, Robertson, and Malmesbury units
 Western Light Horseformed at Worcester 1903, disbanded 1908
 Paarl Volunteersformed 1906, disbanded 1909.

No volunteer units in these districts between 1909 and 1913.

Citizen Force 
 Western Province Mounted Riflesformed at Worcester 1913, disbanded 1929
 1st Western Province Riflesformed at Worcester 1913, disbanded 1929
 2nd Western Province Riflesformed at Malmesbury 1913, disbanded 1929
 3rd Western Province Riflesformed at Stellenbosch 1913, disbanded 1929

No CF units in these districts existed between 1929 and 1934.

Garrison
The regiment was based in the country town of Stellenbosch,  outside Cape Town, and recruited its members from the surrounding districts of the western part of the Cape Province. At that time, Citizen Force service was voluntary.

Brandy
The new Regiment lost no time in ensuring that the inner man was cared for and in 1936 the first specially bottled R.W.P brandy was produced. The much honoured tradition of toasting the Regiment and dignitaries in pure, undiluted R.W.P brandy is still in use today.

With the Union Defence Force

World War Two
The National Party-voting Western Cape districts generally did not support South Africa's involvement in World War II. In spite of this R.W.P was able to muster enough men who were willing to go on active service. The Regiment mobilised on 1 September 1940 and became No. 12 Armoured Car Company, South African Tank Corps. After months of training in this new role, No. 12 Armoured Car Company was amalgamated with No. 11 Armoured Car Company (RSWD) Regiment Suid Westelike Distrikte, to form 5th Armoured Fighting Vehicle Regiment, South African Tank Corps. The Regiment moved to Egypt in September 1941 but was disbanded on 13 October 1941 after arrival. The personnel were used as reinforcements for depleted armoured car regiments already operating in the Western Desert with whom they participated in many of the well known battles in North Africa like Sidi Rezegh, Bir Hakeim, Gazala, and El Alamein.

On the disbandment of the South African Tank Corps early in 1943, former RWP personnel were absorbed into the Royal Natal Carbineers and Imperial Light Horse and soon adapted themselves to tank warfare, serving with distinction in their new units with the 6th South African Armoured Division in Italy.

Post war
The regiment was presented with a Regimental Colour by his Majesty King George VI during the visit of the Royal Family to South Africa on 31 March 1947. The wartime Prime Minister Gen Jan Smuts accepted the appointment as Colonel-In-Chief of the regiment from 17 September 1948.

Remustered and renamed
In 1949, RWP itself was converted to Armour, and it was renamed Regiment Onze Jan, after 19th-century Afrikaner political leader Jan Hofmeyr, in 1951. From 1952, Citizen Force recruits were chosen by ballot rather than volunteering.

During the 1950s and 1960s the Regiment was part of the part-time component of Western Province Command.

With the SADF
When the Army was re-organised for internal security duties in 1960, Regiment Onze Jan was converted back to infantry and was renamed Regiment Boland. Regiment Boland later moved to Paarl and, after the introduction of national service conscription (in 1968), it formed a second battalion in Worcester on 1 September 1970.

The two battalions were separated in April 1974. 1 Regiment Boland resumed the original title Regiment Westelike Provinsie and moved to Cape Town, while 2 Regiment Boland remained in Worcester as Regiment Boland. The only remnant of their association is the similar cap-badges of the two regiments.

Operations
RWP served in the Angola campaign in 1976, and carried out several tours of duty in the Border War in South West Africa. It was also deployed on internal security duties in the Townships during the 1985–90 State of Emergency.

With the SANDF
Military service has been voluntary again since 1994. 71 Motorised Brigade and 9 Division were dissolved in the late nineties and the regiment presently forms part of the South African Army Infantry Formation.

Name change
In August 2019, 52 Reserve Force units had their names changed to reflect the diverse military history of South Africa. Regiment Westelike Provinsie was renamed General Jan Smuts Regiment, and have 3 years to design and implement new regimental insignia.

Jan Smuts, the regiment's honorific, was chosen because Smuts was Colonel-in-Chief of the then Regiment Westelike Provinsie from 1948 until his death. Having served in the Boer War and in both World Wars, the latter of as part of what is now today the SANDF, he was promoted Field Marshal in 1941.

Regimental Symbols

Spelling
In 1983, RWP adopted the Dutch spelling of "Provincie" because it regards itself as the successor to several short-lived volunteer units which existed in the Stellenbosch and Paarl and neighbouring districts in the 19th century, when Dutch, rather than Afrikaans, was the prevailing language in those areas. (See below for a list of those units.)

Insignia
 Badge : The Unit's Badge consists of a wreath of leaves of the Silver Leaf tree encompassing a kernel of the same tree with the inscription R.W.P  Due to an error in the original artwork, the full stop after the "P" was omitted, hence creating a tradition that remains part of the Regimental history.
 Flash : The beret flash (originally a helmet flash) has horizontal stripes of red over white over black, with a blue diamond on the white stripe:  blue and white are the traditional colours of the Western Cape.
 Credo :  "Loyalty, Commitment, Excellence"
 March : , a Dutch translation of the German Der Guten Kamerad.
 Anniversaries : Regimental Day (1 April) Gen. JC Smuts Parade (24 May)
 Brandy : R.W.P 
 Motto :  – Not for ourselves, but for our country.

Previous Dress Insignia

Current Dress Insignia

Regimental Freedoms 
R.W.P has been granted the Freedom of the following Cities:
 
 
 
 
 
 

These honours mean that the Regiment may march on foot or mechanised with drums beating, colours flying and bayonets fixed through the streets of Cape Town or any of the Overstrand towns, namely Hermanus, Rooi Els, Pringle Bay, Betty's Bay, Kleinmond, Fisherhaven, Hawston, Onrus, Sandbaai, Stanford, Gansbaai, Uilenskraal Mond, Franskraal, Pearly Beach and Baardskeerdersbos.

Leadership

Notes

References

External links 
 

Infantry regiments of South Africa
Military units and formations in Cape Town
Military units and formations of South Africa in the Border War
Military units and formations established in 1934